Toyon-Ary (Toyon Arıı) is a rural locality (a selo) in Malzhagarsky 1-y Rural Okrug of Khangalassky District in the Sakha Republic, Russia, located  from Pokrovsk, the administrative center of the district and  from Bulgunnyakhtakh, the administrative center of the rural okrug. Its population as of the 2002 Census was 153.

References

Notes

Sources
Official website of the Sakha Republic. Registry of the Administrative-Territorial Divisions of the Sakha Republic. Khangalassky District. 

Rural localities in Khangalassky District